Paubrasilia echinata is a species of flowering plant in the legume family, Fabaceae, that is endemic to the Atlantic Forest of Brazil. It is a Brazilian timber tree commonly known as Pernambuco wood or brazilwood and is the national tree of Brazil. This plant has a dense, orange-red heartwood that takes a high shine, and it is the premier wood used for making bows for stringed instruments. The wood also yields a historically important red dye called brazilin, which oxidizes to brazilein.

The name pau-brasil was applied to certain species of the genus Caesalpinia in the medieval period, and was given its original scientific name Caesalpinia echinata in 1785 by Jean-Baptiste Lamarck. More recent taxonomic studies have suggested that it merits recognition as a separate genus, and it was thus renamed Paubrasilia echinata in 2016. The Latin specific epithet of echinata refers to hedgehog, from echinus, and describes the thorns which cover all parts of the tree (including the fruits).

Name 
When Portuguese explorers found Paubrasilia on the coast of South America, they recognised it as a relative of an Asian species of sappanwood already used in Europe for producing red dye.  The Portuguese named these trees pau-brasil, the term pau meaning wood, and brasil meaning reddish/ember-like. The South American trees soon dominated the trading as a better source of dye. Such a vigorous trade resulted from the woods that early sailors and merchants started referring to the land itself as Terra do Brasil, or simply, the "Land of Brazil", and from this use the present name of Brazil was derived.

Botanically, several tree species are involved, all in the family Fabaceae (the pulse family). The term "brazilwood" is most often used to refer to the species Paubrasilia echinata, but it is also applied to other species, such as Caesalpinia sappan and Haematoxylum brasiletto.  The tree is also known by other names, as Ibirapitanga, Tupi for "red wood"; or pau de pernambuco, named after the Brazilian state of Pernambuco.

In the bow-making business it is usual to refer to some species other than Paubrasilia echinata as "brazilwood"; examples include pink ipê (Handroanthus impetiginosus), Massaranduba (Manilkara bidentata) and palo brasil (Haematoxylum brasiletto). The highly prized Paubrasilia echinata is usually called "Pernambuco wood" in this particular context.

Description
The leaves are pinnate and each consists of between 9 and 19 small, leathery leaflets, which are broadly oblong in shape. The flower stalk, or inflorescence, is also branched and contains between 15 and 40 yellow, strongly perfumed flowers, which may be pollinated by bees. The petals are usually yellow with a blood-red blotch. The branches, leaves and fruit are covered with small thorns.

There are some important differences between geographically distinct populations and it is thought that separate subspecies of the pau brasil may exist. This tree may have some medicinal properties and has been used as an astringent and antidiuretic by local people; extracts have been tested as possible cancer treatments.

Historical importance

Starting in the 16th century, brazilwood became highly valued in Europe and quite difficult to get. A related wood, sappanwood, coming from Asia was traded in powder form and used as a red dye in the manufacture of luxury textiles, such as velvet, in high demand during the Renaissance. When Portuguese navigators landed in present-day Brazil, on April 22, 1500, they immediately saw that brazilwood was extremely abundant along the coast and in its hinterland, along the rivers. In a few years, a hectic and very profitable operation for felling and shipping all the brazilwood logs they could get was established, as a crown-granted Portuguese monopoly. The rich commerce which soon followed stimulated other nations to try to harvest and smuggle brazilwood contraband out of Brazil, and corsairs to attack loaded Portuguese ships in order to steal their cargo. For example, the unsuccessful attempt in 1555 of a French expedition led by Nicolas Durand de Villegaignon, vice-admiral of Brittany and corsair under the King, to establish a colony in present-day Rio de Janeiro (France Antarctique) was motivated in part by the bounty generated by economic exploitation of brazilwood. In addition, this plant is also cited in Flora Brasiliensis by Carl Friedrich Philipp von Martius.

Excessive harvesting 
Excessive harvesting led to a steep decrease in the number of brazilwood trees in the 18th century, causing the collapse of this economic activity. Presently, the species is nearly extirpated in most of its original range. Brazilwood is listed as an endangered species by the IUCN, and it is cited in the official list of endangered flora of Brazil.

The trade of brazilwood is likely to be banned in the immediate future, creating a major problem in the bow-making industry which highly values this wood. The International Pernambuco Conservation Initiative (IPCI), whose members are the bowmakers who rely on pernambuco for their livelihoods, is working to replant the trees. IPCI advocates the use of other woods for violin bows to raise money to plant pernambuco seedlings.  The shortage of pernambuco has also helped the carbon fiber and composite bow industry to thrive.

The Music Tree, a feature-length documentary on the plight of this species, was finished in 2009.

Replanting efforts 
Restoration of the species in the wild is hampered by the fact that it is a climax community species, which will develop well only when planted amongst secondary forest vegetation. Although many saplings have been distributed or sold during recent decades, that has led to the tree being planted in places outside its natural range, with somewhat poor results, such as happens with brazilwood trees used for urban landscaping in the city of São Paulo, whose development and flowering is usually hampered by the colder environment.

Gallery

References

External links

Saving the Music Tree
About Pernambuco Wood from a bowmaker's website.
USDA Plants Profile: Caesalpinia echinata
Flora Brasiliensis:  Caesalpinia echinata 
Instituto de Pesquisas e Estudos Florestais: Caesalpinia echinata 

Caesalpinieae
Endemic flora of Brazil
Trees of Brazil
Endangered plants
Flora of Bahia
Flora of Pernambuco
Flora of Rio Grande do Norte
Flora of Rio de Janeiro (state)
Plant dyes
Plants described in 1785
Endangered flora of South America
Taxa named by Jean-Baptiste Lamarck
Monotypic Fabaceae genera